The 2013–14 Sydney FC W-League season was the club's sixth participation in the W-League, since the league's formation in 2008.

Season overview

Players

Squad information

Transfers in

Transfers out

Technical staff

Squad statistics

Disciplinary record

Goal scorers

Competitions

Overall

W-League

Pre-season

Matches

League table

Results summary

Results by round

W-League Finals series

International Women's Club Championship

Matches

Awards
 Player of the Week (Round 1) - Nicola Bolger
 Player of the Week (Round 7) - Jodie Taylor
 Player of the Week (Round 9) - Teresa Polias
 Player of the Week (Round 11) - Leena Khamis

References

External links
 Official website

Sydney FC (A-League Women) seasons
Sydney